Nakasato Station is the name of several train stations in Japan:

 Nakasato Station (Iwate) (中里駅)
 Nakasato Station (Nagano) (中佐都駅)